Emblemaria culmenis, the Ridge blenny, is a species of chaenopsid blenny known from a single specimen collected in Venezuela, in the western central Atlantic ocean. It is known to reach a length of  SL.

References
 Stephens, J.S., Jr., 1970 (1 June) Seven new chaenopsid blennies from the western Atlantic. Copeia 1970 (no. 2): 280–309.

culmenis
Fish described in 1970